Hellwigia is a genus of ichneumon wasps.

References 

 First record of the little-known genus Hellwigia (Hymenoptera: Ichneumonidae: Campopleginae) from Korea. JK Choi, JC Jeong, JW Lee - Animal Systematics, Evolution and Diversity, 2011

Ichneumonidae genera
Campopleginae